Razowskiina elcedranus is a species of moth of the family Tortricidae. It is found in Peru.

The wingspan is 16 mm. The ground colour of the forewings is cream, ringed with brownish and suffused with brown in the dorsal third, tinged pearl posteriorly and dotted brownish. The hindwings are cream tinged with brownish, especially on the periphery.

Etymology
The species name refers to the type locality, El Cedro.

References

Moths described in 2010
Euliini